The Sitnica is a river that flows through Podgorica, Montenegro. It is a right tributary of the Morača.

References

Rivers of Montenegro

nn:Sitnica